Stéphane Trévisan  (born 27 March 1974) is a French former professional footballer who played as a goalkeeper. During his career, which began in 1995 at Toulouse Fontaines and concluded in 2010 after a three-year spell with Guingamp. During his career, he made over 200 league appearances.

Career

Club career
Trévisan started his professional career at Guingamp, where he was their number two goalkeeper, first behind Angelo Hugues then behind Ronald Thomas.

After three years, he decided to go to Marseille, where in his first year he would again be number two behind Stéphane Porato, but would still play two Champions League matches. His good performances when he did get into the starting eleven convinced his manager to make him the number one goalkeeper the following year, Porato having returned to Monaco. However, this second season at Marseille, his first ever as a regular in the starting team, quickly turned into a nightmare for Trévisan, who made mistake after mistake while Marseille were battling against relegation. Ultimately, Trévisan decided to give up his spot in the team and to let young keeper Damien Gregorini play the final nine games of the season.

The following summer, he left the club to Ligue 2 side Ajaccio. For his first year there, he helped the club win the league and achieve promotion to Ligue 1, and was named Ligue 2 Goalkeeper of the Year. He finally got to play two complete seasons in Ligue 1 (38 and 32 games respectively), but found himself number two again, and again behind Stéphane Porato for the following two years.

This led him to sign for Sedan, where he only got to play nine games, as, despite his excellent performances, he could never displace local icon Patrick Regnault.

Angry at this treatment he judged unfair, Trévisan left Sedan after just one year to go back to his first club, Guingamp. After a difficult first year where he only got to play 12 games, his second season was much more rewarding as he started almost every league match, and also won the Coupe de France (although Guillaume Gauclin was the starting goalkeeper throughout this competition).

In June 2010, after Guingamp was relegated to the third French league, Trévisan's contract expired and he retired.

Honours
Ajaccio
 Division 2: 2002

Guingamp
 Coupe de France: 2009

References

1974 births
Living people
French footballers
Association football goalkeepers
Toulouse Fontaines Club players
En Avant Guingamp players
Olympique de Marseille players
AC Ajaccio players
CS Sedan Ardennes players
Ligue 1 players
Ligue 2 players